Papageorgopoulos is a Greek surname. It may refer to:
Alkiviadis Papageorgopoulos (born 1937), Greek athlete  
Takis Papageorgopoulos (1934–2015), Greek general and politician
Vasilis Papageorgopoulos (born 1947), Greek athlete and politician

See also
 Papageorgiou

Greek-language surnames
Surnames
Patronymic surnames